Mark Shandii Bacolod (September 17, 1984 – June 8, 2022) was a Filipino director, producer, and talent manager. He has directed the films: Ben & Sam, Fidel, and the short film 5 Minutes.

Aside from directing and producing independent films, Bacolod also ventured into talent and event management. He managed indie actress Mercedes Cabral.

Filmography

Films

Music videos

References

1984 births
2022 deaths
Filipino film directors
People from Masbate